Litlmolla is an uninhabited island in Vågan Municipality in Nordland county, Norway. The island lies east of the town of Svolvær in the Vestfjorden. The island is located in the Lofoten archipelago, south of the large island of Austvågøya, southwest of the island of Stormolla, and northeast of the small island of Skrova. The  island was formerly inhabited, but has long since been abandoned.

See also
List of islands of Norway

References

Islands of Nordland
Vågan
Uninhabited islands of Norway